Zahid Al-Sheikh is an elder brother of alleged 9/11 mastermind Khalid Sheikh Mohammad. He volunteered to travel to Afghanistan to help fight to resist the Soviet occupation of Afghanistan.
Following the ouster of the Soviet forces Zahid is reported to have played a role in
planning terrorist projects.
He is also reported to have shifted careers to the direction of non-governmental organizations that provided aid to refugees.

Zahid and two of his brothers traveled to Afghanistan in the mid-1980s.  His two brothers are believed to have been killed in combat.  His youngest brother, Khalid Shaikh Mohammed, who was later to play a senior role in al Qaeda's leadership arrived in 1987.
Zahid is reported to have introduced his younger brother to leading anti-Soviet fighters.
According to the 9-11 Commission: 

The USA sought Zahid for questioning about whether he played a role in the 1993 World Trade Center bombing.

Zahid is reported to have collaborated with Khalid Sheikh Mohammed in planning Operation Bojinka, a 1995 plan to
hijack 12 airplanes over the Pacific.

On September 26, 2001, shortly after al Qaeda's attacks 2001 attacks on the World Trade Center, The Guardian published a report on their investigation as to whether there was evidence of a real link between Osama bin Laden and Mercy International, the charity Zahid helped run.  They reported they could find no evidence of a link, but called for a more detailed investigation—to reassure the public.

American intelligence analysts alleged, during Adel Hassan Hamad's Combatant Status Review Tribunal and Administrative Review Board hearing that Zahid was tied to terrorism and that Hamad's acquaintanceship with him was one of the factors in favor of his continued detention.
American intelligence analysts alleged that Zahid was the director of the Jelazee Refugee Camp in Pakistan, and the director of Lajnat Al-Da'wa al Islamia (LDI) in Pakistan.
Hamad confirmed that Zahid had been a director of LDI when he first worked as a teacher for the Hira Islamic Institute in the Jelazee Refugee Center, which was supported by LDI, but he told his hearing that Zahid was never the director of the camp.

American intelligence analysts told Hamad's hearing that "other sources" identified Zahid as holding extremist views.
Hamad replied that his relationship with Zahid was a purely administrative one, but he did not believe Zahid was an extremist.

References

Year of birth missing (living people)
Living people
Pakistani people of Arab descent